Arctia bundeli is a moth of the family Erebidae. It was described by Vladimir Viktorovitch Dubatolov and Vladimir O. Gurko in 2004. It is found in Tadjikistan (the southwestern Pamirs).

This species was moved from the genus Oroncus  to Arctia as a result of phylogenetic research published by Rönkä et al. in 2016.

References

Spilosomina
Moths described in 2004
Moths of Asia